Zrnovci is a municipality in the eastern part of North Macedonia. Zrnovci is also the name of the village where the municipal seat is found. Zrnovci Municipality is part of the Eastern Statistical Region.

Geography
The municipality borders Vinica Municipality to the east, Kočani Municipality to the north, Češinovo-Obleševo Municipality to the west, and Karbinci Municipality to the south.

Demographics
According to the 2002 census, Zrnovci Municipality has 3,264 residents. Ethnic groups in the municipality:
Macedonians - 3,247 (99.5%)
others - 17 (0.5%).

Inhabited places
The number of the inhabited places in the municipality is 3.
 Morodvis 
 Vidovište 
 Zrnovci

References

External links
Official website

 
Municipalities of North Macedonia
Eastern Statistical Region